Mikołajskie Lake (Polish: Jezioro Mikołajskie) is glacial lake in Masurian Lake District in Poland.

In the north, Mikołajskie Lake is connected with the Tałty Lake under the road bridge in Mikołajki. To one of the pillars of the bridge, on a spring, is chained the King of Vendaces (Fish King, in Polish: Król Sielaw, Rybi Król, legendary king of Masuria). In the south-east, Mikołajskie Lake is connected with the Śniardwy Lake by the Przeczka strait within Dybowski Róg and Popielski Róg. In the south-west, Mikołajskie Lake is connected with the Bełdany Lake. On the west bank extends the Pisz Forest.

On the shore of the lake are the towns: Mikołajki, Dybowo, Kulinowo, Wierzba.

Notable wildlife:
 Eurasian bittern (Botaurus stellaris)
 Common goldeneye (Bucephala clangula)
 Ruff (Philomachus pugnax)
 Black-throated loon (Gavia arctica)
 Little gull (Larus minutus)

Lakes of Warmian-Masurian Voivodeship